Milford Mill is an unincorporated community and census-designated place in Baltimore County, Maryland, United States. Per the 2020 census, the population was 30,622.

The true name of the area is "Milford", but the name "Milford Mill" has stuck with the community. The name "Milford Mill" comes from the name of an old mill located in nearby Pikesville along Milford Mill Road.

Geography
Milford Mill is located at  (39.347356, −76.760924).

Milford Mill is near the Baltimore County communities of Pikesville, Randallstown, and Woodlawn, around the intersection of Liberty Road and Milford Mill Road. Some areas of Milford Mill are as follows:

Windsor Mill
Windsor Mill is an area near Woodlawn that is similar to Milford Mill. Some of the main roads in the area include Windsor Mill Road, Windsor Boulevard, and Rolling Road. Landmarks in this area include Windsor Mill Middle School and Rutherford Business Park.

Rockdale
Rockdale is mostly near Liberty Road and Lord Baltimore Drive to Rolling Road coming off from I-695. Landmarks in this area include schools like Scotts Branch Elementary and Old Court Middle School. Stores and food areas in the area include the Milford Shopping Center (which is on the left-hand side), Giant Food, and Shoppers Food Warehouse.

Demographics

2020 census

Note: the US Census treats Hispanic/Latino as an ethnic category. This table excludes Latinos from the racial categories and assigns them to a separate category. Hispanics/Latinos can be of any race.

2000 Census
At the 2000 census there were 26,527 people, 10,467 households, and 6,855 families in the CDP. The racial makeup of the CDP was 16.19% White, 79.06% African American, 0.21% Native American, 1.67% Asian, 0.02% Pacific Islander, 0.74% from other races, and 2.11% from two or more races. Hispanic or Latino of any race were 1.82%.

Of the 10,467 households 34.6% had children under the age of 18 living with them, 35.4% were married couples living together, 24.6% had a female householder with no husband present, and 34.5% were non-families. 27.5% of households were one person and 5.4% were one person aged 65 or older. The average household size was 2.49 and the average family size was 3.02.

The age distribution was 27.7% under the age of 18, 8.9% from 18 to 24, 33.2% from 25 to 44, 21.0% from 45 to 64, and 9.1% 65 or older. The median age was 33 years. For every 100 females, there were 82.9 males. For every 100 females age 18 and over, there were 76.2 males.

The median household income was $43,976 and the median family income  was $49,177. Males had a median income of $33,725 versus $31,230 for females. The per capita income for the CDP was $20,195. About 6.7% of families and 8.3% of the population were below the poverty line, including 8.8% of those under age 18 and 10.0% of those age 65 or over.

Government and infrastructure
The Federal Bureau of Investigation (FBI) Baltimore field office is located in Milford Mill.

Education
Baltimore County Public Schools operates public schools.

See also
The Woodlands Golf Course
Woodlawn-Rockdale-Milford Mills, Maryland, 1960 census-designated place

References

 
Census-designated places in Baltimore County, Maryland
Census-designated places in Maryland